Nancy Georgina Pinzón Aguilera (born 6 June 1974) is a Mexican retired footballer who played as a forward. She has been a member of the Mexico women's national team.

International career
Pinzón was part of the Mexican squad at the 1999 FIFA Women's World Cup, but made no appearances during the tournament.

References

1974 births
Living people
Women's association football forwards
Mexican women's footballers
Place of birth missing (living people)
Mexico women's international footballers
1999 FIFA Women's World Cup players